Brian Francis Johns  (6 May 1936 – 1 January 2016) was an Australian company director and journalist, who was managing director of the Special Broadcasting Service (SBS) from 1987 to 1992, and the Australian Broadcasting Corporation (ABC) from 1995 to 2000.

Early life
Johns was born in 1936 in Gordonvale, Queensland, to Frank Johns, a waterside worker and barber, and his Irish-born wife Lenora. The family moved to Sydney in 1947, where Frank ran a barber shop in Kings Cross. The young Brian worked as a paper boy and factory hand, before entering St Columba's Seminary at the age of 16. Three years later, he left the seminary and moved to Canberra.

Journalism career
Johns began his journalism career at The Queanbeyan Age, and as a feature writer specialising in the arts at the Australian News and Information Bureau, a government promotion body. In 1964, he was the first chief political correspondent for The Australian newspaper, and in the next year, a special writer for The Bulletin. In 1966, he joined The Sydney Morning Herald as a leader writer, becoming the paper's chief of staff in 1969, and returning to Canberra as the Herald'''s chief political correspondent in 1972.

Media managerial career
In 1974, Johns returned to government as a consultant and advisor for the First Secretary of the Department of the Prime Minister and Cabinet.

In 1979, Johns joined Penguin Books Australia as publishing director. From 1987 to 1992, he was appointed as managing director of the Special Broadcasting Service (SBS). In 1992, he became chairman of the Australian Broadcasting Authority. From 1995 to 2000, he was managing director of the Australian Broadcasting Corporation (ABC). Initiatives and programs introduced at the ABC during his tenure include ABC Online, the national edition of The 7.30 Report, Australian Story, and the drama series SeaChange''.

From 2000 to 2003, Johns worked for Queensland University of Technology as an adjunct professor in the creative industries faculty and as chairman of the board of the university's cultural precinct. In 2000, he also served as a director on the board of the Copyright Agency Ltd, and was chairman from 2004 to 2009. From 2011, he was a director on the board of Melbourne University Publishing.

Death
Johns died on New Year's Day 2016 in a Sydney hospital, after battling cancer.

Honours
In the 1988 Australia Day Honours, Johns was made an Officer of the Order of Australia (AO) for service to publishing and to the media.

Johns was awarded the Centenary Medal in 2001 for service to the media and broadcasting industry, particularly public broadcasting.

Johns received honorary doctorates from RMIT University and the Queensland University of Technology, where he worked as an adjunct professor.

References

1936 births
2016 deaths
Managing directors of the Australian Broadcasting Corporation
Australian chief executives
Australian journalists
Officers of the Order of Australia
Recipients of the Centenary Medal
Academic staff of Queensland University of Technology
Australian people of Irish descent
People from Cairns
Deaths from cancer in New South Wales
The Sydney Morning Herald people